Cold Chillin' Records was a record label that released music during the golden age of hip hop from the late 1980s to the early 1990s. A producer-and-crew label founded by manager Tyrone Williams and run by Len Fichtelberg (d. November 4, 2010), most of the label's releases were by members of the Juice Crew, a loosely knit group of artists centered on producer Marley Marl. In 1998, the label shut down, and the majority of its expansive catalog was bought by Massachusetts-based LandSpeed Records (now Traffic Entertainment).

History
Initially, Cold Chillin’ was a subsidiary of Prism Records, but label head Tyrone Williams and Fichtelberg decided to merge their companies, and Prism was absorbed by Cold Chillin’. In 1988, it signed a five-year distribution deal with Warner Bros. Records, which remained intact for its full duration. However, since Kool G. Rap and D.J. Polo's third album, Live And Let Die, was rejected by Warner Bros. on behalf of parent company Time Warner because of the anti-gangsta and anti-Time Warner sentiments that followed in the footsteps of the Cop Killer controversy involving hip hop artist Ice-T, Cold Chillin' opted to distribute the album independently, and, as such, it did so with various projects throughout the remaining years of activity, including its short-lived distribution deal with the Epic Street division of Epic Records, which released two albums by the label: the second album by Grand Daddy I.U. and the debut solo effort by Kool G. Rap.

Cold Chillin' also formed a sub-label named Livin’ Large, which released Roxanne Shanté's and YZ's second albums along with several titles by other artists, and was distributed by former Warner Bros. Records subsidiary Tommy Boy Records as part of its deal with Warner.

After it closed down in 1998, rights of the Cold Chillin' catalogue were purchased by Massachusetts-based LandSpeed Records, now known as Traffic Entertainment Group. Along with Ruthless Records, Death Row Records, and Rap-a-Lot Records, Cold Chillin' Records is widely respected for serious contributions to hip hop music during its formative years. In 2006, LandSpeed started releasing new versions of the classic albums in Cold Chillin’s’ catalog with their original artwork intact. However, the albums recorded by Big Daddy Kane remained with Warner Bros. Records, and Kool G. Rap's 4,5,6 remained with Epic Records.

Discography

Albums
Albums marked with (+) were distributed by Warner Bros. Records' sister label Reprise Records. 
Albums marked with (*) were distributed by Epic Street. 
Albums marked with (§) were on sub-label Livin’ Large and distributed by Tommy Boy Records

1987
M.C. Shan—Down by Law
1988
Biz Markie—Goin' Off
Big Daddy Kane—Long Live the Kane 
Marley Marl—In Control Volume 1
MC Shan—Born to be Wild 
1989
Kool G Rap & DJ Polo—Road to the Riches
Big Daddy Kane—It's a Big Daddy Thing +
Biz Markie—The Biz Never Sleeps
Roxanne Shanté—Bad Sister +
1990
2 Deep—Honey, That's Show Biz +
M.C. Shan—Play it Again, Shan
Master Ace—Take a Look Around +
Kool G Rap & DJ Polo—Wanted: Dead or Alive
Grand Daddy I.U.—Smooth Assassin +
Big Daddy Kane—Taste of Chocolate +

1991
Big Daddy Kane—Prince of Darkness +
Kid Capri—The Tape
Diamond Shell—The Grand Imperial Diamond Shell +
Biz Markie—I Need a Haircut
Marley Marl—In Control Volume II (For Your Steering Pleasure)
The Genius—Words from the Genius +
1992
Kool G Rap & DJ Polo—Live and Let Die 
Roxanne Shanté—The Bitch is Back §
Nubian M.O.B. - Nubian M.O.B. +
1993
Big Daddy Kane—Looks Like a Job For… +
Biz Markie—All Samples Cleared!
TBTBT—One Track Mind
YZ—The Ghetto’s Been Good to Me §
T.C.F. Crew—Come & Play with Me
1994
Grand Daddy I.U.—Lead Pipe *
King Sun—Strictly Ghetto
1995
Kool G Rap—4,5,6 *

Non-album singles
Juice Crew All-Stars—"Juice Crew All-Stars"
Big Scoob—"Suckaz Can't Hang"
Big Scoob—"Champagne on the Block"
Juice Crew All-Stars—"Cold Chillin' Christmas"
Juice Crew All-Stars featuring TJ Swan—“Evolution”

See also
Roxanne Wars
The Bridge Wars
Prism Records

References

Further reading

   ‎ 

Hip hop record labels
American record labels
1985 establishments in New York (state)
1998 disestablishments in New York (state)
Record labels established in 1985
Record labels disestablished in 1998
Warner Records
Epic Records
American companies established in 1985
American companies disestablished in 1998
Defunct companies based in New York City